The Illawarra Coke Company (ICC) is located in Coalcliff and Corrimal, in the Illawarra region of New South Wales, Australia where historically coal was mined on the slopes of the Illawarra escarpment. After the mines were closed, coke making still occurs on these sites. The company was the only independent producer of metallurgical and foundry coke in Australia and has been privately owned since 1996. It produced premium grade coke for metallurgical processing and foundry to Australian and overseas base metals producers for lead and zinc smelting and iron production for steelmaking. The company's two cokeworks are adjacent to all major transport links.

In April 2014, Illawarra Coke Company closed.

External links
 "Illawarra Coal" – An unofficial history of coal mining in the Illawarra
 "Coalcliff Cokeworks Closes" - Closure of Illawarra coke Company

Coal companies of Australia
Illawarra escarpment
Coal mining in New South Wales
Companies based in New South Wales
Energy companies established in 1996
Non-renewable resource companies established in 1996